Patricio M. Serna is an American attorney and jurist who served as a justice of the New Mexico Supreme Court from 1996 to 2012.

Early life and education
Serna was born and raised in Reserve, New Mexico. He earned a Bachelor of Science degree in Business Administration from the College of St. Joseph on the Rio Grande, a Juris Doctor from the University of Denver School of Law, and a Master of Laws from Harvard Law School. He was later awarded an honorary Doctor of Laws Degree from the University of Denver School of Law.

Serna was the first in his family to attend college.

Career
Serna began his judicial career as District Court Judge to the First Judicial District in Santa Fe. He served from 1985 until 1996, during which he was also President of the New Mexico District Judges Association.

Serna was sworn onto the Supreme Court on December 5, 1996. He served as chief justice during 2001 and 2002. Serna retired from the court on August 31, 2012.

Serna served as President/Moderator of the National Consortium on Racial and Ethnic Fairness in the Courts. In addition to his judicial duties, he has taught as an adjunct professor at Georgetown University Law Center and Columbus School of Law at Catholic University of America in Washington, D.C.

References

External links
Official biography from the New Mexico Supreme Court
Entry on Judgepedia

Justices of the New Mexico Supreme Court
University of Denver alumni
Harvard Law School alumni
Georgetown University staff
Columbus School of Law faculty
Living people
University of Albuquerque alumni
Year of birth missing (living people)
Chief Justices of the New Mexico Supreme Court